The Central Baseball League, formerly the Texas–Louisiana League, was a independent baseball league whose member teams were not affiliated with any Major League Baseball (MLB) franchises.

In 1991, potential owners, Dallas businessman Byron Pierce and U. S. Congressman John Bryant, became frustrated that the Texas League had no plans to expand into other Texas locations, and formed The Texas–Louisiana League. The league began play in 1994. After further expansion into Missouri and Mississippi, the Texas–Louisiana League changed its name to the Central Baseball League. In 12 seasons, the league produced 10 different champions; Alexandria and Edinburg were the only teams to win a title twice.

After the 2005 season, the eight-team Central Baseball League disbanded.  Five teams joined the American Association: Pensacola, Shreveport, Fort Worth, Coastal Bend and El Paso; and one joined the United League, San Angelo. Edinburg also received a franchise in the United League, unrelated to the now-defunct Roadrunners of the Central League.

Teams
The following teams were, at one time, either a member of the Central Baseball League or the Texas–Louisiana League.
Abilene Prairie Dogs
Alexandria Aces
Amarillo Dillas
Beaumont Bullfrogs (also Bayou Bullfrogs, Lafayette Bullfrogs)
Coastal Bend Aviators
Corpus Christi Barracudas
Edinburg Roadrunners
El Paso Diablos
Fort Worth Cats
Greenville Bluesmen
Jackson Senators (also Jackson DiamondKats)
Lafayette Bullfrogs (also Beaumont Bullfrogs and Bayou Bullfrogs)
Laredo Apaches
Lubbock Crickets
Mobile BaySharks
Pensacola Pelicans
Pueblo Bighorns
Rio Grande Valley WhiteWings
San Antonio Tejanos 
San Angelo Colts
Shreveport-Bossier Sports
Springfield/Ozark Mountain Ducks
Tyler Wildcatters

Texas–Louisiana League champions
1994 Corpus Christi
1995 Lubbock
1996 Abilene
1997 Alexandria
1998 Alexandria
1999 Amarillo
2000 Rio Grande Valley
2001 Edinburg

Central Baseball League champions
2002 San Angelo
2003 Jackson
2004 Edinburg
2005 Fort Worth

References

 
Defunct minor baseball leagues in the United States
Defunct independent baseball leagues in the United States
Baseball leagues in Alabama
Baseball leagues in Arkansas
Baseball leagues in Colorado
Baseball leagues in Florida
Baseball leagues in Kansas
Baseball leagues in Louisiana
Baseball leagues in Mississippi
Baseball leagues in Missouri
Baseball leagues in Texas